Urvashi Chaudhary (born 27 January 1986) is an Indian actress, model, and brand ambassador of Bhojpuri Dabangg CCL 3. She is known for her role as Shaina in the 2009 film, Trump Card.

Early life 
Urvashi was born in the state of Jammu and Kashmir.

Career 
She began her modeling career after tenth-grade examinations in Chandigarh. She has acted in three Bollywood movies; she has played the main lead in the movie Trump Card.

Filmography
 Ishq Na Karna (2006)
 Trump Card (2009) as Shaina
 Kaho Na Kaho (2011) as Roshni

References

External links
 

1986 births
Living people
Actresses in Bhojpuri cinema
Indian stage actresses
Female models from Jammu and Kashmir
Indian television actresses
Indian film actresses
Actresses from Jammu and Kashmir